Mansfield Independent School District is a school district headquartered in Mansfield, Texas, United States.

MISD serves Mansfield and portions of the cities of Grand Prairie, Arlington, and Burleson. A small portion of Cedar Hill, Fort Worth, Kennedale, and Rendon also lie within the district (only in nearby areas). A few Fort Worth and Kennedale residents are zoned mainly to go to Tarver-Rendon Elementary School, and a few Cedar Hill residents are zoned to go to Danny Jones Middle School and Mary Lillard Intermediate School. The district also extends into northeastern Johnson County.

MISD has over 49 schools and district facilities. Among the facilities are six high schools, the Ben Barber Innovation Academy, a competition-level stadium, a natatorium complex, and a center for the performing arts.

In 2011, the school district was rated "Academically Acceptable" by the Texas Education Agency.

History
The district integrated in 1965, the last public school system to do so in the United States.

On June 23, 2020, Mansfield ISD School Board voted to keep their anti-discrimination policies, without mandating inclusive provisions for LGBTQ students and staff.  The Mansfield Equality Coalition had requested the Mansfield ISD School Board include sexual orientation, gender identification, and gender expression.  Training for LGBTQ issues offered by MISD's human resources is optional.

On October 6, 2021, following a school shooting at Mansfield Timberview High School that injured four, Mansfield ISD organized a meeting with community members to discuss safety measures.

Campuses

Elementary schools (PK-4th)

Intermediate schools (5th-6th)

Middle schools (7th-8th)

High schools (9th-12th)

Alternative schools

Controversies
In February of 2020, the school district paid a $100,000 settlement to Charlotte Anderson Elementary School teacher Stacy Bailey. She had been placed on paid administrative leave for showing her students a picture of her fiancee, who is a woman. The district also agreed to remove the eight-month leave from her record, and offer training on LGBTQ issues to human resources and counseling staff.

See also
List of school districts in Texas
Vernon Newsom Stadium

References

External links
 Mansfield Independent School District

School districts in Tarrant County, Texas
School districts in Johnson County, Texas
Mansfield, Texas
Grand Prairie, Texas